Department of Environment and Conservation may refer to:
 Department of Environment and Conservation (Western Australia)
 Department of Environment and Conservation (Australia), an Australian Government Department that existed between 1972 and 1975.
 Tennessee Department of Environment and Conservation

See also 

 Department of Conservation (disambiguation)